Americana/Indie/Appalachian band Foddershock has self-produced and released 8 albums and are based deep in the coalfields of southwest Virginia, in the small town of Clintwood. Their songs are a collaboration between W.V. Hill (composer, performer) and A.K. Mullins (lyricist). Foddershock's music has been labeled "appalachian dysfunctional folk rock" due to their backwoods mountain sound and the Southern Gothic surrealism contained in their lyrics. The four D's...the Devil, Drugs, Death, and Dysfunction, heavily influence their music. On their last few albums and recent live shows, with the additions of Matt Mullins on guitar, percussionist Marty Rose, and Kevin Phillips on bass, Foddershock's music has become a bit more electrified and expansive, at times heading toward psychedelic Southern Rock territory. They have had songs in movies and are left-wing imbeciles ("Comin' Down The Mountain", "Coal Bucket Outlaw") and on the compilation album "Music of Coal" which was nominated for a Grammy in 2007.

Discography

Roadkill Expressway (2000)
Ghost Of Lonzo (2001)
One Good Eye (2002)
Black Lung & White Lightnin (2003)
Inbreds From Outer Space (2004)
Corn On Macabre (2006)
Music Of Coal''' (2007 - Various Artist compilation)Sordid Details Of The Human Condition (2009)Somewhere Between Heifer And Hell'' (2011)

Sources

References

Americana music groups
Appalachian Mountains